Anita Lizana defeated Jadwiga Jędrzejowska 6–4, 6–2 in the final to win the women's singles tennis title at the 1937 U.S. National Championships. The tournament was played on outdoor grass courts and held from September 2, through September 11, 1939 at the West Side Tennis Club in Forest Hills, Queens, New York.

The draw consisted of 64 players of which eight were seeded.

Seeds
The eight seeded U.S. players are listed below. Anita Lizana is the champion; others show in brackets the round in which they were eliminated.

  Alice Marble (quarterfinals)
  Helen Jacobs (semifinals)
  Sarah Fabyan (first round)
  Marjorie Van Ryn (quarterfinals)
  Gracyn Wheeler (third round)
  Dorothy Bundy (semifinals)
  Carolin Babcock (third round)
  Helen Pedersen (first round)

Draw

Final eight

References

1937
1937 in women's tennis
1937 in American women's sports
Women's Singles
Women's sports in New York (state)
Women in New York City
Forest Hills, Queens
1937 in New York City
1937 in sports in New York (state)